Rosenberg Fountain is an outdoor fountain and sculpture by German artist Franz Machtl, installed at Chicago's Grant Park, in the U.S. state of Illinois.

See also
 List of public art in Chicago

References

External links
 

Fountains in Illinois
Outdoor sculptures in Chicago